Trechus placidus is a species of ground beetle in the subfamily Trechinae. It was described by Jeannel in 1962.

References

placidus
Beetles described in 1962